Arkansas Wing of Civil Air Patrol (CAP) is the highest echelon of Civil Air Patrol in the state of Arkansas. Arkansas Wing headquarters are located in Little Rock, Arkansas. Arkansas Wing consists of over 400 cadet and adult members at over 12 locations across the state of Arkansas.

Mission
Civil Air Patrol has three primary missions: providing emergency services; offering cadet programs for youth; and providing aerospace education for CAP members and the general public.

Emergency services
Civil Air Patrol provides emergency services, includes performing search and rescue and disaster relief missions; it also assists in humanitarian aid missions. It provides Air Force support through conducting light transport, communications support, and low-altitude route surveys. Civil Air Patrol may offer support to counter-drug missions.

Cadet programs
Civil Air Patrol runs a cadet program for youth aged 12 to 21, which includes aerospace education, leadership training, physical fitness and moral leadership.

Aerospace education
Civil Air Patrol offers aerospace education for both CAP members and the general public; this includes providing training to the members of CAP, and offering workshops for youth throughout the nation through schools and public aviation events.

Organization

See also
Arkansas Air National Guard
Arkansas State Guard
Awards and decorations of the Civil Air Patrol

References

External links
Arkansas Wing Civil Air Patrol official website

Wings of the Civil Air Patrol
Education in Arkansas
Military in Arkansas